Gimmie Gimmie Gimmie: Reinterpreting Black Flag is a tribute album to the defunct American hardcore punk band Black Flag featuring ex-band members Dez Cadena, Keith Morris and Kira Roessler. They are joined by fellow SST label mates Joe Baiza (Saccharine Trust) and Mike Watt (Minutemen) as well as Jimmy Destri of Blondie, produced by Evan Taylor.

Track listing
All songs originally written and recorded by Black Flag except where noted.
 	
Rise Above
Gimmie Gimmie Gimmie
Six Pack
Nervous Breakdown
In the Jailhouse Now (Jimmie Rodgers and Elsie McWilliams)
Thirsty and Miserable

Personnel 

Dez Cadena – vocals (1,3,6)
Kira Roessler - vocals (2,4)
Keith Morris - vocals (5)
Mike Watt - bass (3,5)
Joe Baiza - guitar (5)

References

External links
Gimmie Gimmie Gimmie: Reinterpreting Black Flag at Discogs

2010 compilation albums
Black Flag (band) tribute albums